St.-Quirin-Platz is an U-Bahn station in Munich on the U1 line of the Munich U-Bahn system.

See also
List of Munich U-Bahn stations

External links

References

 St.-Quirin-Platz Photos

Munich U-Bahn stations
Railway stations in Germany opened in 1997
Buildings and structures completed in 1997